Turkey competed at the 1928 Summer Olympics in Amsterdam, Netherlands.

31 competitors participated at six sports branches of athletics, cycling, fencing, football, weightlifting and wrestling.

In the Amsterdam Olympics, Turkey received fourth place for the first time ever. Tayyar Yalaz was the Turkish Olympian, whose name was listed in the official table of honor, which lists six best contestants in each event. He wrestled in the 67 kg division of Greco-Roman style to come in fourth.

Athletics

Men's 100 m flat
 Mehmet Ali Aybar - Preliminary contest (1st round) 5th series, eliminated
 Semih Turkdogan - Preliminary contest (1st round) 6th series, eliminated
 Sinasi Sahingiray - Preliminary contest (1st round) 10th series, eliminated
 Enis H. - Preliminary contest (1st round) 16th series, eliminated

Men's 800 m flat
 Ömer Besim Kosalay - Preliminary contest 6th series, eliminated

Men's 1500 m flat
 Ömer Besim Kosalay -  Preliminary contest 4th series, eliminated

Men's Running high jump
 Haydar Aşan - Preliminary contest 3rd series, 1.70 m

Men's 400 m relay
 Mehmet Ali Aybar, Semih Turkdogan, Sinasi Sahingiray, Enis H., Ömer Besim Kosalay - Preliminary contest 3rd series, eliminated

Cycling

Track races

1 km against time
 Galip Cav  - 1.22.3 14th place

1 km scratch
 Cavit Cav - Requalifying races 4th series, eliminated

4 km pursuit race
 Galip Cav, Yunus Nüzhet Unat, Cavit Cav, Tacettin Öztürkmen - Preliminary contest (1st round) 3rd series, eliminated

Fencing

Men's sabre
 Nami Yayak - Preliminary contests 4th pool, 6th place
 Muhuttin Okyavuz - Preliminary contests 5th pool, 5th place
 Enver Balkan - Preliminary contests 8th pool, 7th place

Men's team sabre
 Fuat Balkan, Enver Balkan, Muhuttin Okyavuz, Nami Yayak - Semifinals 2nd pool, 4th place

Football

The soccer team was beaten 7-1 by Egypt on May 28, 1928. Alaeddin scored Turkey's only goal. For Egypt, Moktar El-Tetch scored 3, Gamil El-Zobair scored one, Mohamed Houda scored 2, and Ali Reyadh scored one.

Team: Muhlis S., Ulvi Z., Burhan I., Şükrü H., Osman S., Alaeddin E., Nafız O., Latif Y., Cevad R., Mehmet S., Kemal F., Kadri D., Nihat A., Sabih M., Bedri H., Bekir R., Zeki R., İsmet S., Feyzi R., Şevki M.

Weightlifting

Featherweight
 Cemal Ercman - 262.5 kg 8th place

Wrestling

Men's Greco-Roman style

Bantamweight (- 58 kg)
 Burhan Conker - 2nd round, eliminated

Featherweight (58 – 62 kg)
 Saim Arikan - 4th round, eliminated

Lightweight (62 - 67.5 kg)
 Tayyar Yalaz - 4th place

Middleweight (67.5 – 75 kg)
 Nuri Boytorun - 4th round, eliminated

Light heavyweight (75 - 82.5 kg)
 Şefik Ahmet Yigner - 2nd round, eliminated

Heavyweight (+ 82.5 kg)
 Mehmet Coban - 3rd round, eliminated

References

External links
 Official Olympic Reports
  Bilal Çoban website 
 1928 Olympics official report

1928 in Turkish sport
Nations at the 1928 Summer Olympics
1928